Paul Alan Marks (August 16, 1926 – April 28, 2020) was a medical doctor, researcher and administrator. He was a faculty member and president at Memorial Sloan Kettering Cancer Center.

Background
Marks was born in Mahanoy City, Pennsylvania, in 1926, to Robert Marks and Sarah Bohorad. Marks attended Columbia College and Columbia Medical School. After completing postdoctoral research at the United States National Institutes of Health and at the Institut Pasteur in France, he joined the faculty at Columbia University. Marks served as dean of the Medical Faculty at Columbia University from 1970 to 1973. He was president and chief executive officer at Memorial Sloan Kettering from 1980 until 1999. Marks died at his Manhattan home from pulmonary fibrosis and lung cancer on April 28, 2020 at the age of 93.

Scholarly activities
Marks contributed to the fields of genetics and oncology. His recent work was focused on histone deacetylases (HDACs) and chemicals that interfere with HDAC enzymatic activities (HDAC inhibitors or HDIs). Marks and others found that drugs such as Trichostatin A and SAHA (vorinostat) can serve as anticancer agents.

Marks published more than 400 scientific articles and was the editor-in-chief of journals including the Journal of Clinical Investigation and Blood.

Honors and affiliations
Member, National Academy of Sciences
Member, Institute of Medicine
Recipient, President's National Medal of Science
Fellow, American Academy of Arts and Sciences
Fellow, The American Philosophical Society

Paul Marks Prize for Cancer Research
The Paul Marks Prize for Cancer Research was established by Memorial Sloan Kettering to honor Marks's contributions "as a distinguished scientist and leader". The prize has been awarded every two years since 2001.

Works
 editor, Cancer Research in the People's Republic of China and the United States of America (1981)

References

1926 births
2020 deaths
American geneticists
American oncologists
Columbia University faculty
Columbia University Vagelos College of Physicians and Surgeons alumni
Scientists from New York (state)
Fellows of the AACR Academy
Columbia College (New York) alumni
Members of the United States National Academy of Sciences
Journal of Clinical Investigation editors
Presidents of the American Society of Hematology
Members of the National Academy of Medicine